Bamang Felix is an Indian politician from the state of Arunachal Pradesh. Felix was elected unopposed from the Nyapin seat in the 2014 Arunachal Pradesh Legislative Assembly election, standing as a National Congress Party candidate.

See also

 Arunachal Pradesh Legislative Assembly

References

People's Party of Arunachal politicians
Indian National Congress politicians
Living people
Bharatiya Janata Party politicians from Arunachal Pradesh
Arunachal Pradesh MLAs 2019–2024
Arunachal Pradesh MLAs 2014–2019
State cabinet ministers of Arunachal Pradesh
Year of birth missing (living people)